Mircea Stanciu (born 30 April 1975) is a Romanian former professional footballer. He played in Romania's Liga I for FC Steaua București, FC Oțelul Galați, FC Olimpia Satu Mare, CSM Reșița and FC Apulum Alba Iulia.

References

1975 births
Romanian footballers
Living people
Association football forwards
FC Steaua București players
ASC Oțelul Galați players
FC Olimpia Satu Mare players
CSM Reșița players
CSM Unirea Alba Iulia players
People from Ocna Mureș